The Vel is a river in Konoshsky and Velsky Districts of Arkhangelsk Oblast in Russia. It is a left tributary of the Vaga. Its main tributaries are the Podyuga and the Shonosha (both left).

The Vel has its sources in the bogs south of the urban-type settlement of Konosha. It flows north-east, then turns south-east, and around the village of Bolshaya Gora it accepts two right tributaries, the Votchitsa and the Tavrenga, and turns north-east. It enters Velsky District, and behind the settlement of Solginsky sharply turns north-west, until the confluence with the Podyuga. From this point, the Vel flows north, accepts the Shonosha in the selo of Ust-Shonosha, and turns east. In the selo of Shunems it turns south-east. The town of Velsk is situated at confluence of the Vel with the Vaga.

The Vel was used for timber rafting till the 1990s.

References

External links 

 

Rivers of Arkhangelsk Oblast